This is the discography of Australian house producer and DJ Timmy Trumpet.

Albums

Extended plays

Singles

As lead artist

As featured artist

Remixes
2010
 Goldfish - "This Is How It Goes" (Timmy Trumpet Remix)
 P Money featuring David Dallas and Aaradhna - "Say Yeah" (Timmy Trumpet Remix)
 Radio Ink - "Wish You Were Here" (Timmy Trumpet Remix)

2011
 Potbelleez - "Midnight Midnight" (Timmy Trumpet Remix)
 P Money featuring PNC, Vince Harder, Meryl Cassie and Mz J - "Dance with You" (Timmy Trumpet Remix)

2012
 Tenzin - "Love Goes On" (Timmy Trumpet Remix)

2014
 Quintino and MOTi featuring Taylr Renee - "Dynamite" (Timmy Trumpet Remix)
 Havana Brown - "Better Not Said" (Timmy Trumpet Remix)

2017
 Throttle - "Baddest Behaviour" (Timmy Trumpet Remix)

2019
 Tujamo - Drop That Low (When I Dip) (Timmy Trumpet Remix)
 Deorro - All This Time (Timmy Trumpet Remix)

2020
 Edward Maya and Vika Jigulina - "Stereo Love" (Timmy Trumpet Remix)
 Joel Corry featuring MNEK - "Head & Heart" (Timmy Trumpet Remix)
 3 Are Legend, Toneshifterz and Brennan Heart - "Deck the Halls" (Timmy Trumpet Edit)

2021
 Illenium, Dabin, and Lights - "Hearts On Fire" (Timmy Trumpet Remix)
 Dimitri Vegas & Like Mike and Vini Vici - "Get in Trouble (So What)" (Timmy Trumpet Remix)
 Steve Aoki and Willy William featuring Sean Paul, El Alfa, Sfera Ebbasta and Play-N-Skillz - "Mambo" (Timmy Trumpet Remix)
Felix - "Don't You Want Me" (Timmy Trumpet x Felix)

Notes

References

Discographies of Australian artists
Electronic music discographies